Shivpuri is a neighbourhood in Patna, capital of Bihar, India.

Geography 
Shivpuri is situated in the middle of the City of Patna, the Capital of Bihar state. It stretches from A.N. College in the North to B.S.E.B Colony, Patel Nagar in the South, in the East of it lies Mohanpur, Punaichak and in the West of it lies Patel Nagar, Indrapuri and Mahesh Nagar. It carries its name because of the Shiv mandir (temple of Shiva) at the very entrance from A. N. college, just after railway crossing. Another famous place is Radha Krishna Sai Mandir which attracts thousand and thousand of devotee on Thursday. Nearby Sai mandir Buddha painting in sitting posture is also visible on front wall of a building named SIYARAM SADAN. Dr. B. Sahani electro Homeopathy clinic is one of the oldest clinic in this area. Other famous old places includes Tarang Press, Marigold convent School, HRDT school etc.

Places of interest 
Sai mandir in the campus of Radha Krishna Mandir, Shiv Mandir at Shiv Market, Vishwakarma Temple at Shivpuri Railway Halt, Relation Store, Sumant medical hall and The Subzi Mandi are the chief attractions of Shivpuri. A painting of sitting Buddha under bodhi tree is depicted on a building named Siyaram Sadan in RKM road

Transport 
Shivpuri is connected to rest of the city through road and the railway line of Digha-Patna Jn. The Digha Block six lane elevated road connects it to the main railway station. From Pani Tanki one can easily get through hundreds of auto-rickshaws plying on the road the railway station, High Court and Bailey road. Buses are also there for commuters which can be found at Pani Tanki and Gandhi Murti.

Demographics 
SHIVPURI being one of the busy urban establishments of Patna is well settled in the vicinity of Boring Road. It has been home to  some of the eminent personalities like Dr. M. K Shani, son of Late Dr. B Sahani, founder of Tarang Homeopathy and Tarang press,Late Dr.Ambika Prasad, Dr. Rama Shankar Prasad, Dr Dharm Nath Prasad Roy, Er. Kailash Bihari Prasad, Shri B N Singh, Shri Verma, Shri Prakash Narayan Pandey, Shri Balajee Pathak, Shri Devendra Prasad Singh, Shri Harihar Prasad Singh, Shri Ramchandra etc. to name a few. People from all walks of life satiate themselves peacefully in this settlement. The development bug has bitten it in such a manner that multiple shops and commercial complexes have come up in recent times. A SBI branch has opened up right at the mouth and several apartments have been erected rapidly modifying its demography. It even holds two marriage convention centres. Students from here, are leaving their mark in various fields. Hustle and bustle of town often seems to be an integral part this corner like any other. All in all, the growth has generated several jobs of multi genres, thereby improving the livelihood quotient.

Economy 

Shivpuri has a printing press industry as there are 5-6 printers located here. There is also a Carbon Paper Factory in Shivpuri. But the central business point is the Shivpuri market which consists of the Subzi Mandi and other markets of all types of shops.

Education 

There are 4-5 private schools in Shivpuri of whom H.R.D.T Public School is the most important school imparting education. Other schools are Sunshine Public school, R.S. Academy and Government Primary School. Affiliated Schools nearby Shivpuri are D.A.V BSEB colony, International School, Rose Bud School, K.B.Sahay High School and Shashtri Nagar Girls High School. Colleges Nearby Shivpuri are A.N. College, Patna Women's College and J.D Women's College to which students after their +2 study. A few important coaching institutes are also there in Shivpuri which are Deepak Science Zone, Eureka Coach Well, Abha Choudhary Classes, Bharti Sir Classes, Medhir Classes and Ponderer's Point.

Social organisations 

Baba Bateshwar Sewa Sansthan is doing commendable job for the people of Shivpuri. Another group of people which is Pragya Samiti, organises Saraswati Puja every year in the Locality. Gang war is one of the issues faced in this area. Patrol gang is one of the brutal gangs that can be found assaulting mine gang members.

Culture 

Almost all the residents of Shivpuri are Hindus. Most of them belong to upper caste category. On auspicious occasions like marriages, the whole of a lane is invited to the party. This is the tradition of Shivpuri.

References 

Neighbourhoods in Patna